The 2006 Wisconsin gubernatorial election  was held on November 7, 2006. Incumbent Democratic Governor Jim Doyle ran for re-election to a second term in office. Doyle was unopposed in the Democratic primary, and he faced U.S. Representative Mark Green, who was unopposed in the Republican primary, in the general election. The campaign between Doyle and Green was competitive and hotly contested, but Doyle, whose approval ratings hovered around 50%, had the upper hand. In the end, Doyle defeated Green by a fairly comfortable margin, improving on his 2002 victory in the process. 

This was the only Wisconsin gubernatorial election won by a Democrat with an outright majority of the vote between 1982 and 2022, and remains the largest winning margin garnered by a Democrat since 1982.

Democratic primary

Candidates
Jim Doyle, incumbent Governor of Wisconsin

Results

Republican primary

Candidates
Mark Green, U.S. Representative

Withdrew
Scott Walker, Milwaukee County Executive and former State Representative

Results

Green Party primary

Candidates
Nelson Eisman

Results

General election

Predictions

Polling

Results

See also
U.S. gubernatorial elections, 2006

References

External links
Mark Green for Governor (R)
 Jim Doyle Re-Election Site (D)
 Eisman for Wisconsin (G)

2006
Governor
2006 United States gubernatorial elections